John Alleyne was Dean of St Patrick's Cathedral, Dublin from 1466 until 1506, having previously been Precentor.

He was noted for charity: he built an almshouse on Kevin Street, near the Cathedral, and left most of his money for its support. In his will he directed that his body be buried under the statue of St Patrick in the nave of the Cathedral. The nave collapsed due to neglect in 1554. He was also a  Master in the Court of Chancery (Ireland).

References

Deans of St. Patrick's Cathedral, Dublin
15th-century Irish Roman Catholic priests
16th-century Irish Roman Catholic priests
Year of birth missing
Year of death missing